Forest Park in Chalfont, PA was originally picnic grounds and later a small amusement park.

History of grounds
The arrival of the railroad in Chalfont heralded in new visitors to the area. In 1835, George Eckhardt opened "Eckhardt's Grove," a park for picnics and enjoyment. Eckhardt operated the former Simon Butler mill during the first half of the 19th century and was well known for his secret counting of his profits every Saturday night by candlelight. In 1885, his mill burned down for the second time, hurting his business and in turn, the Grove. Eventually, it became known as "Funk's Park." In 1885, the new "Forest Park" opened. One of its main attractions was the music played by the Chalfont Cornet Band.

Amusement park
In 1930, Koons and Sanders, a partnership, bought the park. However, their business was suffering. In 1933, the Lusse Family, known for their scooters, installed a scooter ride in the park that became very popular. Later the Lusses even brought radio shows to the park, most notably the Uncle Ezra show in 1933. Soon, popularity for the park grew and in 1934, the Lusses bought the park and increased popularity. Soon, a number of amusement park rides, such as a merry-go-round and swan ride came to the park. A large swimming pool was constructed in the 1930s. In 1945, a woman was buried alive for ten days generating much local publicity and guests to the park. 
In 1948, Frontiertown was opened with a mini-railroad and many vintage stores. One of the chief attractions was being able to meet a real Native American, "Chief One Star."
The park was at its height in the post-war years of the 1940s. Strings bands came weekly and soon companies starting having their picnics there. One year, Budd's picnic attracted 40,000 employees to the park.

Decline
In the late 1950s things starting going downhill for the park. The school board levied an amusement tax. Limits were made to the special trains that brought guests to the park. However, the worst was still to come. On Memorial Day of 1958, a race riot took place, causing much damage and injuring 20 people. That day, there were around 20,000 guests at the park and during the riot many fled into the woods to escape the danger. This event marked the beginning of the end for Forest Park. In 1968, the park closed.

Legacy
Today, Forest Park exists only in the memories of those who loved it. At first, the grounds became a forest again, minus the old swimming pool, which remained. However, since then, neighborhoods with amusement park inspired names have sprung up on the area. For many years, the remains of the picnic groves stood along with the ruins of some buildings, a ghostly remembrance of the happy days of old. However, for those who spent countless summer days at this local gem, the golden memories much outlast the park. As of 2014, there are still the remains of concrete based park benches scattered about.

References

Defunct amusement parks in Pennsylvania